Preisner, Preissner may refer to

 Rio Preisner (1925 - 2007), a Czech poet, philosopher, translator, and scholar of Czech and German literature
 Stefanie Preissner (born 1988), an Irish writer and actress 
 Zbigniew Preisner, born: Zbigniew Antoni Kowalski (born 1955)

See also 
 Preis
 Preiss

References 

German-language surnames